Eszter Tóth (born 27 October 1992) is a Hungarian handballer for Mosonmagyaróvári KC SE and the Hungarian national team.

She represented Hungary at the 2020 European Women's Handball Championship.

Achievements
Nemzeti Bajnokság I:
Winner: 2010, 2011, 2012
Magyar Kupa:
Winner: 2010, 2011, 2012
EHF Champions League:
Finalist: 2012
Semifinalist: 2010, 2011

References

External links

Eszter Tóth player profile on Győri Audi ETO KC Official Website
Eszter Tóth career statistics at Worldhandball 

1992 births
Living people
Sportspeople from Győr
Hungarian female handball players
Győri Audi ETO KC players